Tivoli Software encompasses a set of products originally developed by Tivoli Systems Inc.  IBM bought the company and ran the operation as its Tivoli Software division.  Additional products were acquired and run under the Tivoli portfolio brand.  IBM began phasing out use of the Tivoli brand in 2013 and by 2016 had moved the portfolio products into a revised and rebranded hierarchy.

History

Tivoli Systems Inc. was founded in Austin, Texas in 1989 by Bob Fabbio and quickly joined by Peter Valdes,  Todd Smith and Steve Marcie; all were former IBM employees.  Bob Fabbio in an interview indicated the purpose was to provide systems management on systems from a diverse set of vendors while at IBM he had been directed to focus on IBM products only. As an independent software vendor Tivoli Systems developed and sold Tivoli Management Environment (TME) "systems management" software and services.  The then CEO Frank Moss saw the company listed on NASDAQ in March 1995 and the subsequent merger into IBM in 1996. 

At the start of 2002, Tivoli Systems Inc, became Tivoli Software, a brand within IBM. IBM initially grew the software portfolio under the Tivoli brand through development and acquisition.  There are some thoughts this may have resulted in the brand containing a large set of overlapping and marginal products  In April 2013 IBM renamed "Tivoli Software" Division to "Cloud & Smarter Infrastructure".  IBM moved away from the Tivoli brand as exemplified by the explicit rebranding of Tivoli Storage Manager to IBM Spectrum Protect and the renaming of IBM Tivoli Workload Scheduler to IBM Workload Scheduler as of release 9.3.

Market position

According to IT analyst research firm Gartner, Inc., IBM in 2012 owned the largest share of the "IT Operations Management" software market, with an 18% market share. IBM was also the leading provider of Enterprise Asset Management software, for the 7th consecutive year, according to ARC Advisory Group, a research analyst firm for industry and infrastructure.

Service management segments

Service management segments related to the Tivoli brand software and services included the following:

 Virtualization Management
 Storage Management
 IT Service Management
 Application Performance Management
 Network Management
 System and Workload Automation 
 Server, Desktop, Mobile Device Management & Security
 Enterprise Asset Management
 Facilities Management

List of IBM Tivoli products

Tivoli products and integration platforms

Tivoli Management Framework 

Tivoli Management Framework (TMF) is a CORBA-based systems and network management framework.  It allows administrators to manage large numbers of remote locations or devices. In the early years of TMF's lifecycle it was a pre-requisite to several other key Tivoli components.  With IBM's adoption and promotion of other non-TMF based products, such as Micromuse Netcool Omnibus in February 2006 and the increasing general acceptance of Secure Shell in preference to CORBA meant TMF entered the latter stages of product lifecycle.  The final independent release version of TMF was 4.1.1 with release 4.3.1 supplied with and to Tivoli Configuration Manager 4.3.1 in 2008.

Tivoli Service Request Manager
 
Tivoli Service Request Manager manages configuration items (CI) and critical assets.  It was previously known as Maximo Service Desk.

Netcool/OMNIbus

IBM Tivoli Netcool/OMNIbus operations management software consolidates complex IT and network operation management tasks as the primary event management platform within the suite.

References

See also 
 List of mergers and acquisitions by IBM

IBM acquisitions
Systems management
American companies established in 1989
Software companies established in 1989
1989 establishments in Texas
Software companies based in Texas
Companies based in Austin, Texas
1996 mergers and acquisitions
Defunct software companies of the United States